Miguel Ángel Cornero, (12 March 1952 – 19 November 1999) was an Argentine football defender.

Career
Born in Rosario, Santa Fe, Cornero began playing football as a sweeper or stopper with hometown club Rosario Central. He was called into the Argentina national under-21 football team, but never appeared for the senior national team.

Cornero moved to Mexico in 1974, joining Club América for three seasons. He moved to crosstown rivals Cruz Azul, where he won the Mexican Primera División twice. He finished his career playing with Deportivo Toluca F.C. during the 1983–84 season, giving way to a debilitating nervous system injury which stemmed from a kick to the head suffered earlier in his career.

Personal
Cornero died in a Mexico City hospital at age 47, survived by his wife and three children.

References

External links

1952 births
1999 deaths
Argentine footballers
Argentine expatriate footballers
Rosario Central footballers
Club América footballers
Cruz Azul footballers
Deportivo Toluca F.C. players
Liga MX players
Expatriate footballers in Mexico
Association football defenders
Footballers from Rosario, Santa Fe